Pedro Ángel Quiñónez Rodríguez (born March 4, 1986) is an Ecuadorian footballer. He currently plays for C.D. El Nacional.

Club career
Quiñónez signed with El Nacional at the age of 16. He played for the U-16, U-18, and U-20 team before finally getting a senior team cap in 2004. He played at both the senior level and Sub 20 level in 2005, after which he became a full senior team member. In 2005 and 2006, he helped El Nacional win two national championships, tying the club as the most successful team in Ecuador. He is a starting key player and due to his solid performances he was called up to the national team. He can play in many midfield positions as a good option for players needed for a position needed.

On December 12, 2008, Quiñónez signed with Primera Division de Mexico's Santos Laguna from Torreón, Coahuila, for an undisclosed amount.

On January 14, 2010, Quiñónez was transferred on a loan with an option to buy to Ecuadorian giants Emelec. He became a fundamental part of the team during the 2010 season, and his loan was extended until late 2011. On November 2011, Quiñónez was finally bought by Emelec, after paying the transfer to Santos Laguna.

International career
In 2007, he was called up to play in the Copa America 2007 to replace the injured Luis Caicedo, although he was called up he was a non playing member for Ecuador. He played against Mexico on November 12, 2008 in the United States.

References

External links

1986 births
Living people
Sportspeople from Esmeraldas, Ecuador
Association football midfielders
Ecuadorian footballers
Ecuadorian expatriate footballers
Ecuador international footballers
2007 Copa América players
2015 Copa América players
C.D. El Nacional footballers
Santos Laguna footballers
C.S. Emelec footballers
Ecuadorian Serie A players
Liga MX players
Expatriate footballers in Mexico
Ecuadorian expatriate sportspeople in Mexico